Petrino may refer to:

People 
 Bob Petrino Sr. (1937–2018), American football coach
 Bobby Petrino (born 1961), American football coach
 Dimitrie Petrino (—1878), Bessarabian and Romanian poet
 Paul Petrino (born 1967), American football coach

Places 
 Petrino, Targovishte Province, a village in Targovishte Province, Bulgaria
 Petrino, Resen, North Macedonia
 Petrino, Vologda Oblast, Russia